Abdu Shaher (born 1957) is an English karateka. He is a winner of multiple European Karate Championships and World Karate Championships Karate medals.

References

External links
 

1957 births
Living people
English people of Pakistani descent
Karate coaches
English male karateka
British Asian people
World Games bronze medalists
Competitors at the 1985 World Games
Competitors at the 1989 World Games
World Games medalists in karate